Richard Willoughby Gott (born 28 October 1938), is a British journalist and historian. A former Latin America correspondent and features editor for the British newspaper The Guardian, he is known for his radical politics and a connection to Che Guevara. He resigned from The Guardian in 1994 after claims that he had been a Soviet "agent of influence", a tag Gott denied.<ref>Donegan, Lawrence. Spy-watchers split on KGB's pounds 10,000", The Guardian, 12 December 1994</ref>

Early life
Gott was born in Aston Tirrold in the Berkshire Downs in South East England, and is the son of Constance Mary Moon and Arthur Francis Evelyn Gott.

Education

From the years 1952 ('Short Half') to 1957, Gott was educated at Winchester College, a 14th-century independent school for boys in Winchester, Hampshire, where he boarded at House G (Sergeant's). Then, from 1958 to 1961, he attended Christ Church at the University of Oxford, as an Exhibitioner, where he obtained a B.A. in Modern History.

Media career
After studying history at Oxford University, Gott worked at the Royal Institute of International Affairs. In the 1960s he worked at the University of Chile, where he wrote Guerrilla Movements in Latin America. In January 1966, Gott was a candidate in the 1966 Kingston upon Hull North by-election for the 'Radical Alliance', running on a platform which stressed opposition to the Vietnam War; he polled only 253 votes.

In November 1963, working as a freelance journalist for The Guardian in Cuba, Gott was invited to a celebration of the revolution party at the Soviet Union embassy in Havana. During the evening, a group of invited journalists who were chatting in the garden were joined by Marxist revolutionary Che Guevara for a few hours, who answered their questions.

In Bolivia in 1967, Gott identified Guevara's dead body after the failure of Guevara's Bolivian campaign. He was the only one in the country who had met Guevara.

In 1981 the BBC's Alasdair Milne and Aubrey Singer sought to appoint Gott to the position of editor of its cultural magazine, The Listener, but as Gott failed to obtain security clearance from MI5, his file was marked and Russell Twisk was appointed instead. Gott was then appointed features editor for The Guardian.

Work for KGB

In 1994, Gott admitted KGB contacts beginning in 1964, and to having taken Soviet gifts, which he called "red gold". One of his controllers was Igor Titov, who was expelled by the UK in 1983 for "activities incompatible with his diplomatic status" (espionage), but who left while still denying that he was a spy.

Resignation
After his period as features editor, Gott became literary editor of The Guardian, but resigned from the latter post in December 1994 after it was alleged in The Spectator that he had been an "agent of influence" for the KGB, claims which he rejected, arguing that "Like many other journalists, diplomats and politicians, I lunched with Russians during the cold war". He asserted that his resignation was "a debt of honour to my paper, not an admission of guilt", because his failure to inform his editor of three trips abroad to meet with KGB officials at their expense had caused embarrassment to the paper during its investigation of Jonathan Aitken.

The source of the allegation that Gott had been an agent was KGB defector Oleg Gordievsky. In his resignation letter, Gott admitted: "I took red gold, even if it was only in the form of expenses for myself and my partner. That, in the circumstances, was culpable stupidity, though at the time it seemed more like an enjoyable joke". One issue was whether during the 1980s, the KGB would have thought Gott's information worth £10,000. Phillip Knightley, biographer of the KGB agent Kim Philby, highlighted the limited value of outsider Gott as compared to insider Aldrich Ames; Knightley concluded that Gott would have been lucky to get his bus fare back. Rupert Allason pointed out valuable activities such as talent-spotting and finding people who did have highly classified access.

Selected bibliography
Books
 
 
 
 
 
 
Gott, Richard (2011). Britain's Empire: Resistance, Repression and Revolt. Verso Books.

Journal articles
  Available online.
Review of Gustavo Cisneros: Un Empresario Global by Pablo Bachelet.

References

External links

 
 New Statesman, 4 October 1999, Book Reviews – A looking-glass world – In 1994 it was claimed that Richard Gott was a KGB "agent of influence". In this article he responds that the claim was anti-spy hysteria which amounted to McCarthyism
 The Guardian, 1 February 2006, – A Comment piece about his standing in the 1966 North Hull By election
Richard Gott Relishes this Sweet Moment in US-Cuban Relations by Richard Gott, The Guardian'', 14 April 2009
What If Latin America Ruled the World? – a review by Richard Gott, 3 July 2010
Who Comments? – Richard Gott – Chronology of articles and biographical information

1938 births
Living people
Alumni of Christ Church, Oxford
English male journalists
People educated at Winchester College
People from Aston Tirrold
The Guardian journalists